The Hood Island giant tortoise (Chelonoidis niger hoodensis) is a subspecies of Galápagos tortoise endemic to Española Island in the Galápagos.

Population history
This population was very heavily exploited by whalers in the 19th century and collapsed around 1850. 13 adults were found in the early 1970s and held at the Charles Darwin Research Station as a breeding colony. The two males and 11 females were initially brought to the Darwin Station. Fortuitously, a third male (Diego) was discovered at the San Diego Zoo and joined the others in a captive breeding program. Mating had not occurred naturally for some time, because the individuals were so scattered that they did not meet. Following the successful captive breeding program, large numbers have been released back into the wild and are now breeding on their own with the population reaching over 2,300 individuals as of August, 2020.

Description
It is one of the smallest subspecies of Galápagos tortoise. Its black, saddle-backed carapace has a deep cervical indentation, the anterior rim only weakly upturned, and posterior marginals downturned and slightly serrated. It is narrow anteriorly and wider posteriorly.

Etymology
Its subspecies name, composed of hood and the Latin suffix -ensis: "who lives in", was given in reference to the place of its discovery, Española Island, which is also called Hood Island.

See also 
 Diego (tortoise)

References

 Van Denburgh, 1907 : Expedition of the California Academy of Sciences to the Galapagos Islands, 1905–1906. I. Preliminary descriptions of four new races of gigantic land tortoises from the Galapagos Islands. Proceedings of the California Academy of Sciences, ser. 4,  (texte intégral).

Chelonoidis
Subspecies
Taxa named by John Van Denburgh
Endemic reptiles of the Galápagos Islands
Reptiles described in 1907